Songs for Australia is a compilation album curated by Australian singer-songwriter Julia Stone to aid bushfire relief, consisting of covers of well-known Australian songs by other artists from around the world. The album was released on 5 March 2020 online and was made available in June 2020 in stores. Proceeds will go to Firesticks, Landcare Australia, SEED, Emergency Leaders for Climate Action, WildArk and the NSW Rural Fire Service.

Track listing

See also 

 Artists Unite for Fire Fight

References

External links
 https://songsforaustralia.com/

2020 compilation albums
Charity albums
Various artists albums